Bijoy Sarkar (born Bijay Krishna Adhikari; 20 February 1903 – 4 December 1985) was a Bangladeshi poet, baul singer, lyricist and composer.

Biography
Sarkar was born in Dumdi village, Jessore District, British India (now Narail District, Bangladesh).

He studied at Tabra Primary School, taught there briefly, later worked as a rent collector, and participated in stage performance and folk songs. In 1925, he joined Manohar Sarkar from Gopalganj and Rajendranath Sarkar.

Recordings
 Bengali folk songs, Bijoy Sarkarer gaan (2004)

Awards
Sarkar was awarded the Ekushey Padak, Bangladesh's highest civilian award for contribution in the field of arts, posthumously in 2013.

References

Further reading
 Kobiyal Bijoy Shorkarer Jibon O Shongit (Life and Songs of Kaviyal Bijay Sarkar), Bangla Academy, 1994: includes about 375 of his songs.

Sk Makbul Islam's article "Methodological Understanding of Researches Executed on Bijay Sarkar", published in 'Folklore and Folkloristics', Vol. 7, No. 2, December 2014, p. 95-175.

Bengali people
1903 births
1985 deaths
Bangladeshi male musicians
Bangladeshi Hindus
Lyricists
Recipients of the Ekushey Padak
People from Narail District
20th-century male musicians